Instruments used specially in oncology (surgery) are as follows:

Instrument list

Image gallery

References 

Medical equipment
Oncology